Józef Ignacy Kraszewski (28 July 1812 – 19 March 1887) was a Polish writer, publisher, historian, journalist, scholar, painter, and author who produced more than 200 novels and 150 novellas, short stories, and art reviews, which makes him the most prolific writer in the history of Polish literature. He is best known for his epic series on the history of Poland, comprising twenty-nine novels in seventy-nine parts.

Biography
He was the oldest son born to a family of the Polish nobility (Szlachta). He studied medicine, then philosophy, at the University of Vilnius, and was a supporter of the November Uprising in 1830. As a result, he was arrested and imprisoned until 1832. After his release, he had to live under police supervision in Vilnius, but was allowed to go to his father's estate near Pruzhany the following year. In 1839, he published his first important work, the novel Poeta i świat (The Poet and the World).

Between 1841 and 1851, in Vilnius, he published the literary and scientific journal . When this failed, he returned to Warsaw, where he became a contributor to the Gazeta Warszawska, in addition to his other writing. In 1853, in an effort to better support and educate his four children, they moved to Zofia's inherited family estate near Zhytomyr, where he became a school superintendent and, in 1856, Director of the local theatre. He also dealt with the issue of serfdom, and was a member of the "Committee for the Liberation of the Peasant Estate"; advocating in favor of land grants. This was met with strong opposition and threats.

Following the January Uprising, he fled to avoid being exiled to Siberia. His intention was to live in France, but he stopped when he reached Dresden, where he met many of his fellow revolutionaries, and was involved in relief efforts for Polish refugees. He remained there until 1868, when he began travelling; to Switzerland, Italy, France and Belgium. Later, he published an account of his travels: Reiseblätter (Travel Sheets).

His application for Saxon citizenship was approved in 1869. He acquired some property, with a garden, and lived there until 1879, when he able to afford a larger property. He lived there until 1883, when he was arrested, while visiting Berlin, and accused of working for the French secret service. He was, in fact, making monetary contributions to the French government. After being tried by the Reichsgericht in Leipzig, he was sentenced to three and a half years imprisonment in Magdeburg. Due to poor health, he was released on bail in 1885.

Rather than remain in Magdeburg, as required, he returned to Dresden, sold his property, and left to look for a new home in Sanremo. There, he hoped to regain his health, and avoid being arrested again. When the possibility of extradition arose, he fled to Geneva, where he died, four days after his arrival. His remains were transferred to Kraków, and he was interred at "Saint Michael the Archangel and Saint Stanislaus the Bishop and Martyr Basilica", commonly known as "Skałka".

He is credited with over 240 novels and short stories. His best-known works are the six "Saxon Novels", written between 1873 and 1883 in Dresden. Together, they create a detailed history of the Electorate of Saxony, from 1697 to 1763. The first of his books to be adapted for film was Gräfin Cosel (1968), directed by Jerzy Antczak, with Jadwiga Barańska in the title role.

Selected works

The Saxon Novels
 König August der Starke, (Augustus II the Strong), Aufbau Tv, 1999 
 Gräfin Cosel, (Anna Constantia von Brockdorff), Aufbau Tv, 2012 . Translated into English as Countess Cosel; by the Comte de Soissons, Skomlin Ltd., 2017 
 Feldmarschall Flemming, (Jacob Heinrich von Flemming), Aufbau Tv, 2001, 
 Graf Brühl, (Heinrich von Brühl), Aufbau Tv, 2000 . Translated into English as Count Brühl, by the Comte de Soissons, Skomlin Ltd., 2017  
 Aus dem Siebenjährigen Krieg, Aufbau Tv, 2000 
 Der Gouverneur von Warschau, Aufbau Tv, 2003,

Other novels
 1839: Poeta i świat, (The Poet and the World), Universitas, Lesser-Known Classics Series, 2002 . Gustav, a poor poet, finds his sensibilities at odds with everyday life.  
 1840: Mistrz Twardowski, (Master Twardowski), reissued by Nabu Press, 2010 . A sorcerer makes a deal with the Devil.
 1841: Chata za wsią, (The Cottage outside the Village), Wolne Lektury, 2012 . A complicated romance that gives a realistic picture of Gypsy life and its conflicts with the prevailing culture.
 1842: Ulana, Ossolineum, 1996, . A young nobleman, tired of the city, goes to live in a small village, where he falls in love with a peasant girl.
 1843: Latarnia czarnoksięska, (The Magic Lantern), Wydawnictwo Literackie, 1989 . Stanisław, a naïve young man, comes from abroad to live with relatives in Volhynia, then becomes bored and moves to Warsaw, meeting numerous characters along the way.
 1845: Ostap Bondarczuk, Ludowa Spoldzielnia Wydawnicza, 1985, . The story of an orphan, in a village of serfs in Ukraine, during the Napoleonic wars.
 1846: Zygmuntowskie czasy, (Sigismund's Times), MG, 2011 . A 16th-century tale about the adventures of a boy who goes to Kraków as a novice.
 1847: Budnik, (The Building), Wolne Lektury, 2013 . A rural tale of foresters and home builders; their families and relationships.
 1874: Morituri (Latin: About to Die), Wydawnictwo Literackie, 1986 . A cautionary tale about the fall of a noble family in post-partition Poland.
 1876: Stara baśń, (An Ancient Tale), MG, 2018 . A story of political intrigues in pre-Christian Poland.

References

Sources
 Elżbieta Szymańska/Joanna Magacz: Kraszewski-Museum in Dresden, Warschau 2006. 
 Zofia Wolska-Grodecka/Brigitte Eckart: Kraszewski-Museum in Dresden, Warschau 1996. 
 Elżbieta Szymańska/Ulrike Bäumer: Andenken an das Kraszewski-Museum in Dresden, ACGM Lodart, 2000
 Victor Krellmann: "Liebesbriefe mit ebenholzschwarzer Tinte. Der polnische Dichter Kraszewski im Dresdner Exil", In: Philharmonische Blätter 1/2004, Dresden 2004.
 Friedrich Scholz: Die Literaturen des Baltikums. Ihre Entstehung und Entwicklung. Westdeutscher Verlag, Opladen 1990. 
 Henryk Szczepański: Gwiazdy i legendy dawnych Katowic – Sekrety Załęskiego Przedmieścia. Katowice: Wydawnictwo Naukowe Śląsk, 2015.

External links

 Detailed biography from the Brockhaus and Efron Encyclopedic Dictionary @ Russian Wikisource

 
 
 
Polish Literature in English Translation
Kraszewski's Museum
Detailed biography @ the Virtual Library of Polish Literature
Józef Ignacy Kraszewski - biography and poems at poezja.org

1812 births
1887 deaths
Writers from Warsaw
Polish historical novelists
Polish male novelists
Polish opinion journalists
19th-century journalists
Male journalists
19th-century Polish novelists
19th-century Polish male writers
Poles - political prisoners in the Prussian partition